Ramzi Chouchar (born 16 June 1997) is an Algerian swimmer.

He competed at the 2017 Islamic Solidarity Games and the 2018 Mediterranean Games. He also competed at the 2016 Arab Swimming Championships and 2018 Arab Swimming Championships as well as the 2016 African Swimming Championships and the 2018 African Swimming Championships.

He represented Algeria at the 2019 African Games held in Rabat, Morocco. He won the gold medal in the men's 400 metres individual medley event. He also won the bronze medals in the men's 4×200 metres freestyle relay and the mixed 4×100 metres freestyle relay events. Chouchar only swam in the heats in the mixed 4×100 metres freestyle relay event.

He represented Algeria at the 2022 Mediterranean Games held in Oran, Algeria. He competed in the men's 100 metre breaststroke and men's 200 metre breaststroke events as well as the men's 200 metre individual medley and men's 400 metre individual medley events.

References 

1997 births
Living people
Place of birth missing (living people)
Algerian male swimmers
Male breaststroke swimmers
Male medley swimmers
Algerian male freestyle swimmers
Mediterranean Games competitors for Algeria
Swimmers at the 2018 Mediterranean Games
Swimmers at the 2022 Mediterranean Games
African Games medalists in swimming
African Games gold medalists for Algeria
African Games bronze medalists for Algeria
Swimmers at the 2019 African Games
Islamic Solidarity Games competitors for Algeria
Islamic Solidarity Games medalists in swimming
20th-century Algerian people
21st-century Algerian people